The 1984 UK Athletics Championships was the national championship in outdoor track and field for the United Kingdom held at Cwmbran Stadium, Cwmbran. It was the third time the event was held in the Welsh town, following on from its hosting in 1977 and 1982. The competition was affected by heavy winds that year, particularly the jumps and sprints.

It was the eighth edition of the competition limited to British athletes only, launched as an alternative to the AAA Championships, which was open to foreign competitors. However, due to the fact that the calibre of national competition remained greater at the AAA event, the UK Championships this year were not considered the principal national championship event by some statisticians, such as the National Union of Track Statisticians (NUTS). Many of the athletes below also competed at the 1984 AAA Championships.

Fatima Whitbread won her fourth consecutive women's javelin throw UK title, while Aston Moore won his third straight men's triple jump title. Aside from Moore, four men successfully defended their 1983 titles and Peter Elliott (1500 metres), Keith Stock (pole vault), Derrick Brown (long jump) and Peter Yates (javelin). Venissa Head was the only woman to defend her title, doing so in the discus throw. Heather Oakes was the only athlete to win multiple UK titles, taking the women's 100 metres and 200 metres to repeat a feat she had achieved five years previously.

The main international track and field competition for the United Kingdom that year was the 1984 Olympic Games. Reflecting the secondary nature of the UK competition and the fact it was not used as the Olympic trial event, only one of the 14 British individual Olympic medallists took a UK title that year – Fatima Whitbread. British Olympic relay medallists Simmone Jacobs, Heather Oakes and Kriss Akabusi were present at the UK Championships, however.

Medal summary

Men

Women

References

UK Athletics Championships
UK Outdoor Championships
Athletics Outdoor
Sport in Monmouthshire
Athletics competitions in Wales